The Japan Record Award for  is awarded annually. Until the 10th Japan Record Awards it was called the New Artist Award.  Starting with the 11th, it has been called the Best New Artist Award. At present all nominees for the Best New Artist Award are awarded the New Artist Award.

1960s

1970s

1980s

1990s

2000s

2010s

2020s

See also 
 Japan Record Award

References

External links 
 List of Best New Artist Award winners - TBS official website
  - Sports Hochi

Japanese music awards